The 1955 Cincinnati Bearcats football team was an American football team that represented the University of Cincinnati as an independent during the 1955 college football season. In their first year under head coach George Blackburn, the Bearcats compiled a 1–6–2 and were outscored by a total of 199 to 97.

Schedule

References

Cincinnati
Cincinnati Bearcats football seasons
Cincinnati Bearcats football